Ascarophis is a genus of parasitic nematodes, belonging to the family Cystidicolidae. Species of Ascarophis are parasitic as adults in the gastrointestinal tract of marine and estuarine fishes.

Species
According to the World Register of Marine Species, the genus currently (2019) includes many species. A few are listed here:

 Ascarophis arctica Polyansky, 1952
 Ascarophis ayalai Caballero, 1975
 Ascarophis beryx Kataitseva, 1979
 Ascarophis brasiliensis Pinto, Vicente & Noronha, 1984
 Ascarophis capelanus Nikolaeva & Naidenova, 1964
 Ascarophis carvajali Muñoz & George-Nascimento, 2007
 Ascarophis cestus Chitwood, 1934
 Ascarophis cooperi Johnston & Mawson, 1945
 Ascarophis crassicollis Dollfus & Campana-Rouget, 1956 
 Ascarophis distorta Fusco et Overstreet, 1978 
 Ascarophis morrhuae Van Beneden, 1871  (Type-species) a parasite of the Atlantic cod Gadus morhua.

Several subgenera have been proposed, with the following species:

 Subgenus Ascarophis (Dentiascarophis) Moravec & Justine, 2009 
 Ascarophis (Dentiascarophis) adioryx Machida, 1981 
 Subgenus Ascarophis (Paraspinitectus) Moravec & Justine, 2009 
 Ascarophis (Paraspinitectus) beaveri Overstreet, 1970 
 Subgenus Ascarophis (Similascarophis) Muñoz, González & George-Nascimento, 2004 
 Ascarophis (Similascarophis) chilensis (Muñoz, González & George-Nascimento, 2004) Moravec & González-Solís, 2007 
 Ascarophis (Similascarophis) marina (Szidat, 1961) Ivanov, Navone & Martorelli, 1997
 Ascarophis (Similascarophis) maulensis (Muñoz, González & George-Nascimento, 2004) Moravec & González-Solís, 2007 
 Ascarophis (Similascarophis) nasonis Machida, 1981 
 Ascarophis (Similascarophis) richeri Moravec & Justine, 2007

References

Cystidicolidae
Parasites of fish
Secernentea genera
Parasitic nematodes of fish